Perils of the Sentimental Swordsman is a 1982 Hong Kong wuxia film directed by Chor Yuen, produced by the Shaw Brothers Studio and starring Ti Lung. It was adapted from Youling Shanzhuang of Gu Long's Lu Xiaofeng novel series. In the film, the original protagonist, Lu Xiaofeng, was replaced by Chu Liuxiang, the lead character of another novel series by Gu Long. It was preceded by Clans of Intrigue (1977) and Legend of the Bat (1978).

Synopsis 
Chu Liuxiang attempts to assassinate the Eight Prince but fails and is pursued by the prince's men. He has no choice but to seek refuge in the sinister Phantoms' Mountain Manor, which houses criminals and people who have committed wicked deeds. In fact, Chu and the prince had staged the assassination attempt to fool the evil residents of the manor, so that Chu can infiltrate the manor and eliminate them.

Cast 

 Ti Lung as Chu Liuxiang
 Teng Wei-hao as Long Wu
 Ku Kuan-chung as Liu Changjie
 Lo Lieh as Xuanyuan Siguang
 Linda Chu as General
 Tai Liang-chun as Zhong Ling
 Ku Feng as Old Hawk
 Lau Siu-kwan as Cousin
 Yeung Chi-hing as Dugu Mei
 Cheng Miu as Eight Prince
 Alan Chan as Golden Finger Du Qi
 Yuen Tak as Zhou Bailong
 Kwan Fung as Lan Meng
 Yuen Wah
 Yuen Bun
 Erik Chan
 Yeung Hung
 Wong Chi-ming
 Siao Yuk

 Ting Tung
 Ng Yuen-fan
 Cheung Chok-chow
 Kong Chuen
 To Wing-leung
 Gam Tin-chue
 Lee Ging-fan
 Tam Bo
 Cheung Bing-chan
 Ma Hon-yuen
 Wong Chi-keung
 Ho Hon-chau
 Ailen Sit
 To Wai-wo
 Lee Fat-yuen
 Wang Han-chen
 Man Man
 Sai Gwa-pau

References

External links 
 
 

1982 films
Hong Kong martial arts films
Hong Kong action thriller films
Wuxia films
1982 martial arts films
1980s action thriller films
1980s mystery films
Shaw Brothers Studio films
Works based on Chu Liuxiang (novel series)
Films directed by Chor Yuen
Films based on works by Gu Long
1980s Mandarin-language films
1980s Hong Kong films